The Arboretum de Varennes-en-Argonne (2.5 hectares) is a municipal arboretum located in Varennes-en-Argonne, Meuse, Lorraine, France. It is jointly managed by the town and the Office National des Forêts, contains 40 types of trees, and is open daily without charge.

See also 
 List of botanical gardens in France

References 
 L'Echo des Chênaies entry (French)

Varennes-en-Argonne, Arboretum de
Varennes-en-Argonne, Arboretum de